Bushman or bushmen may refer to:
 San people in Southern Africa
 The Hermit, a figure in the Carnival of Satriano, know also as "bushman" or "treeman".
 Bushman (comics), a Marvel Comics supervillain
 Bushman (reggae singer) (born 1973), Jamaican musician
 Bushman contingents, formations of Australian mounted troops who fought in the Second Boer War
 World Famous Bushman, San Francisco busker
 People who live in the Alaskan bush
 People who live in the Australian or New Zealand bush
"An Old Bushman", the pseudonym of British naturalist Horace William Wheelwright (1815–1865)

People with the surname Bushman:

Brad Bushman (born 1960), American psychologist
Claudia Lauper Bushman (born 1934), American historian specializing in Mormon women's history
Matt Bushman (born 1995), American football player
Francis X. Bushman (1883–1966), American actor and director
Francis X. Bushman Jr.  (1903–1978), American actor
Lindsay Bushman (1994), American actress
Richard Bushman (born 1931), American historian and Mormon scholar
Yuriy Bushman (born 1990), Ukrainian footballer

See also
Buschmann, a surname